The Xié River may refer to either:

 Xie River (Brazil)
 Xie River (Chinese: , Xié Chuān) in China

See also
 Xie (disambiguation)